Midea or Mideia (Μίδεια) was a city of ancient Argolis.

Mythology and proto-history
Midea was originally called Perseuspolis (Περσέως πόλις), and is mentioned by Pseudo-Apollodorus in connection with this hero. It was said to have derived its name from the wife of Electryon, and was celebrated as the residence of Electryon and the birthplace of his daughter Alcmena, best known as the mother of Heracles. But it is mentioned in the earliest division of the country, along with the Heraeum and Tiryns, as belonging to Proetus. It was the residence of Hippodameia in her banishment.

History
It was destroyed by Argos, probably at the same time as Tiryns, soon after the Greco-Persian Wars. Strabo describes Midea as near Tiryns; and from its mention by Pausanias, in connection with the Heraeum and Tiryns, it must be placed on the eastern edge of the Argeian plain; but the only clue in the ancient authors to its exact position is the statement of Pausanias, who says that, returning from Tiryns into the road leading from Argos to Epidaurus, "you will reach Mideia on the left."

Site and remains
The remains of Midea, that of a Bronze Age citadel, stand above the village of the same name in the Argolid. The citadel is one of the largest and best preserved Mycenaean citadels. A tholos tomb and cemetery of chamber tombs at nearby Dendra is associated with the site. 

Excavations were started by the Swedish archaeologist Axel W. Persson and have been continued regularly by the Swedish Institute at Athens and published in the journal Opuscula.

See also 

 Swedish Institute at Athens

Sources 

 Swedish Institute at Athens - Midea, Argolid: https://www.sia.gr/en/articles.php?tid=339&page=1

References

External links

Populated places in ancient Argolis
Former populated places in Greece
Mycenaean sites in Argolis
Ancient Greek archaeological sites in Greece
Locations in Greek mythology
Citadels in Greece